Peter John M. Nicholson (born May 3, 1942) is a Canadian economist, former politician, and science policy expert. He represented the electoral district of Victoria in the Nova Scotia House of Assembly from 1978 to 1980, as a member of the Nova Scotia Liberal Party.

Early life and education
Nicholson was born at Halifax in 1942, the son of former Nova Scotia MLA Peter M. Nicholson. He attended Dalhousie University and Stanford University and holds Bachelor of Science, Master of Science, and Doctor of Philosophy (Ph.D.) degrees.

Personal life
In 1982, he married Penelope Jane Connolly.

References

1942 births
Living people
Dalhousie University alumni
Nova Scotia Liberal Party MLAs
People from Halifax, Nova Scotia
People from Victoria County, Nova Scotia
Stanford University alumni
Members of the Order of Canada